"Pictures of You" is a song by American rock band the Last Goodnight. It was released in June 2007 as the first single from their debut album, Poison Kiss (2007). The song peaked at number 70 on the US Billboard Hot 100 chart and became a top-three hit in Australia and the Czech Republic. The song is certified platinum in Australia for shipping over 70,000 copies.

Music video
"Pictures of You" was supported in a promo video directed by Marc Klasfeld. The video plays upon the song's title, mixing in various "pictures" to create the images and scenes which comprise the video. The same music video was being used by ABC Television and the Seven Network to promote the second season of Brothers & Sisters, but with scenes from the show mixed in.

Track listings
European CD single
 "Pictures of You" – 3:10
 "Get Closer" – 3:26

European maxi-CD single
 "Pictures of You" – 3:10
 "Push Me Away" (album version) – 3:00
 "When It All Comes Down" – 2:59
 "Now That You're Gone" – 3:41
 "Pictures of You" (instrumental) – 3:14

Australian CD single
 "Pictures of You" – 3:10
 "Get Closer" – 3:26
 "Pictures of You" (video)

Charts

Weekly charts

Year-end charts

Certifications

Release history

References

2007 debut singles
2007 songs
The Last Goodnight songs
Music videos directed by Marc Klasfeld
Songs written by Jeff Blue
Virgin Records singles